Albert Humphreys ( 1864–1922) was an American sculptor and painter born near Cincinnati, Ohio.  He studied in Paris with Gerome and Alexander Harrison.

Returning to the United States Humphreys worked from 1882–1884 at the Rookwood Pottery decorating Limoges pieces.

Work 
Humphreys’ paintings and sculpture can be found in:
 National Gallery of Art, Washington D.C.
 Boston Public Library
 Detroit Institute of Art
 Bronx Community College, Bronx, New York
 Children’s Fountain, Center Park, Manchester, Connecticut

References 

1864 births
1922 deaths
Artists from Cincinnati
Sculptors from Ohio
20th-century American sculptors
20th-century American male artists
19th-century American sculptors
19th-century American male artists
American male sculptors
Rookwood Pottery Company